Matt Fridy (born January 17, 1976) is an American politician and lawyer. He serves as a judge on the Alabama Court of Civil Appeals and served in the Alabama House of Representatives from the 73rd district from 2014 to 2020.

Fridy graduated from the University of Montevallo and received a J.D. degree from the Cumberland School of Law.

Fridy was elected to the Alabama Court of Civil Appeals on November 3, 2020, receiving 1,524,104 votes in an uncontested race in the General Election.  He defeated Judge Philip Bahakel in the March 3, 2020, Republican primary with about 66% of the vote.

References

1976 births
Living people
Republican Party members of the Alabama House of Representatives
Alabama state court judges
21st-century American politicians
21st-century American judges
Cumberland School of Law alumni
University of Montevallo alumni